Zhao Yujie (born 28 April 1999) is a Chinese international footballer currently playing as a midfielder at HB Køge playing in the Danish Women's League.

Club career
Born in Shanghai, China, Zhao represented the Shanghai under-18 side before moving to the United States to study at the Florida State University.

Career statistics

International

Honours 
Florida State Seminoles
 NCAA Division I Women's Soccer Championship: 2018, 2021

References

External links
 Zhao Yujie at the Florida State University

1999 births
Living people
Chinese women's footballers
China women's international footballers
Florida State Seminoles women's soccer players
Women's association football midfielders